Cheban or Ceban is a Romanian surname that may refer to
Jonathan Cheban (born c. 1974), American reality star
Nicolae Ceban (born 1986), Moldovan freestyle wrestler
Yuriy Cheban (born 1986), Ukrainian sprint canoeist 
Yury Cheban, Minister in Transnistria 

Romanian-language surnames